The Inspiration of Saint Matthew (1602) is a painting by the Italian Baroque master Michelangelo Merisi da Caravaggio. Commissioned by the French Cardinal Matteo Contarelli, the canvas hangs in Contarelli chapel altar in the church of the French congregation San Luigi dei Francesi in Rome, Italy.  

It is one of three Caravaggio canvases in the chapel: hanging between the larger earlier canvases of The Martyrdom of Saint Matthew, and The Calling of Saint Matthew. This was not an easy commission for Caravaggio, and at least two of the three paintings had to be either replaced or repainted to satisfy his patron, the Cardinal Del Monte.

Creation 
In February 1602, following the installation of his first two pieces in the chapel, Caravaggio was contracted to create an altarpiece, to be delivered by Pentecost of that year. The first painting he created, Saint Matthew and the Angel, was rejected and later destroyed in World War II. 

The Inspiration of Saint Matthew was finished rather quickly, with Caravaggio receiving payment by September 1602.

Description 
In the work featured on the altar, the angel belongs to an aerial and sublime dimension, enveloped in an encircling rippled sheet. The restless Matthew leans to work, as the angel enumerates for him the work to come. All is darkness but for the two large figures. Matthew appears to have rushed to his desk, his stool teetering into our space. His expression is sober.

See also
List of paintings by Caravaggio

Further reading 
 Jürgen Müller, Das geöffnete Buch. Caravaggios Altargemälde ‚Die Inspiration des Evangelisten Matthäus durch den Engel‘ in der Contarelli-Kapelle und die Laienlektüre der Bibel, in: Kunstgeschichte. Open Peer Reviewed Journal, 2021

References

External links

Paintings by Caravaggio
Artworks in San Luigi dei Francesi
1602 paintings
Religious paintings
Angels in art
Paintings depicting Matthew the Apostle
Books in art
Altarpieces